The Society Islands ( officially Archipel de la Société) are an archipelago located in the South Pacific Ocean. Politically, they are part of French Polynesia, an overseas country of the French Republic. Geographically, they form part of Polynesia.

The archipelago is believed to have been named by Captain James Cook during his first voyage in 1769, supposedly in honour of the Royal Society, the sponsor of the first British scientific survey of the islands; however, Cook wrote in his journal that he called the islands Society "as they lay contiguous to one another."

History

Dating colonization 
The first Polynesians are understood to have arrived on these islands around 1000AD.

Oral history origin 
The islanders explain their origins in term of a orally transmitted story. The feathered god Ta'aroa lay in his shell. He called out but no-one answered, so he went back into his shell, where he stayed for aeons. When he came out he changed his body into the multi-layered dome of the sky. Other parts of his body he transformed into Papa-fenua, the earth. Other parts he made into Te Tuma, the ata, or shadow of his phallus. Ta'aroa said, "Cast your eyes on my phallus. Gaze upon it and insert it in the earth." He came down to earth at "Opoa in Havai'i" (now Ra'iatea), one of the most sacred places in the Society Islands. Other gods were created, and these ran directly into the time of the people. The high chiefs or ari'i rahi were descendants from the gods, reckoned to be forty generations previous. In their presence commoners showed respect by stripping to the waist. The high chiefs erected marae as places of worship.

In the generations before Europeans arrived, a cult called 'Oro-maro-'ura developed: the cult of the red-feathered girdle. This became a tangible symbol of the chief's power. Key followers of the 'Oro cult were the 'arioi, who lived separately from the common people. They wore scented flowers and adorned themselves with scents and scarlet-dyed cloth. The head of each 'arioi group was heavily tattooed from ankle to thigh and known as a blackleg. Both male and female blacklegs were a privileged group but they were forbidden to have children. Their babies were all killed at birth. They received and gave lavish presents. They had a wide range of artistic skills and could be priests, navigators and lore specialists. Only good-looking men or women could become 'arioi. They played a crucial role in ceremonies associated with birth, deaths and marriage.

European contact 
In 1767 HMS Dolphin, sailing under Captain Samuel Wallis, landed on Tahiti. The captain and crew were quite sick with scurvy on arrival and were keen to obtain fresh food. Europeans quickly found that the islanders were desperate to obtain iron, which was prized for use in woodworking and as fish-hooks. The sailors found that young women and girls were eager to exchange sex for a nail.

The islanders were delighted at the abundance of iron on the ship and tried to board the ship in search of iron. Wallis reported that he shot cannon to maintain control of his vessel and the iron on board.

Louis de Bougainville, a French nobleman, sailor and soldier, left France on his circumnavigation of the globe in 1766. By the time he reached the Society islands in 1768, his crew was stricken with scurvy. Despite the crew being twice as numerous as that of the Dolphin, the islanders had sufficient food to trade their surplus for axes, knives and other iron goods.

James Cook arrived in Tahiti in April 1769.

Between 1772 and 1775, the viceroy of Peru, the Spaniard Manuel Amat y Juniet, organized three expeditions to the Society Islands. Having news of James Cook's expedition and fearing a British colonization of the island, he ordered a first expedition under the command of the Spanish sailor Domingo de Bonechea, with Tomás Gayangos as assistant, aboard the frigate "Águila". In the second expedition (1774-1775), Domingo de Bonechea and José Andía y Varela, aboard the ships "Águila" and "Júpiter", recognized or discovered a dozen islands between the archipelagos of Tuamotu and the Austral Islands, and established a mission in Tahiti, which lasted only a couple of years. Domingo de Bonechea, whose health was weakened, died during this expedition.

The islands became a French protectorate in 1843 and a colony in 1880 under the name of French Establishments of Oceania (Établissements Français d'Océanie, EFO).

Geography

The islands are divided, both geographically and administratively, into two groups:
 Windward Islands (Îles du Vent) (listed from east to west)
 Mehetia
 Tahiti
 Teti'aroa
 Moorea
 Maiao
 Leeward Islands (Îles Sous-le-Vent)
 Huahine
 Raiatea
 Taha'a
 Bora Bora
 Tupai
 Maupiti
 Mopelia
 Motu One 
 Manuae

They have a population of 275,918 inhabitants. The Society Islands are a tropical South Sea archipelago of volcanic origin. They represent the most economically important of the five archipelagos of French Polynesia. The highest point is Mount Orohena, which reaches 2,241 meters, located on the island of Tahiti.

The population of the islands is concentrated in the coastal regions and becomes increasingly sparse towards the mountainous center of the islands. The main island of Tahiti (Îles du Vent), where 50% of the inhabitants live, is also home to the capital of French Polynesia, the city of Papeete.

Fauna and flora 

The tropical forests of French Polynesia are home to a great variety of rare animals and plants.

Above all, the islands are known for their olfactory landscape. The Tahitian tiaré (Gardenia taitensis), which blooms exclusively on the Society Islands, is one of the most fragrant of all flowers and is now protected.

The atolls surrounding the islands are covered with numerous corals, around which butterfly and clown fish frolic. Manta rays also reside here.

However, part of the underwater world of French Polynesia has been affected by nuclear tests conducted by the French government between 1966 and 1968.

Climate 
The climate of the islands varies between tropical and subtropical due to their size. The heat and very high humidity, together with the islands' fertile volcanic soils, have created dense, mostly inaccessible tropical forests. There are two seasons: a warm one, which lasts from November to March, and a cooler one, from April to October.

Religion 
Most of the population of the Society Islands profess Christianity including various Protestant Christian denominations and the Catholic Church. The Protestants arrived with the first English explorers, while the Catholics settled in the area first with the arrival of the Spanish and permanently with the beginning of the French colonization of the region, which was consolidated with the establishment of a protectorate over the islands. By 1774 the Spanish had settled in the region briefly and installed a large cross that they brought from their colonies in Peru.

In January 1775 the priest Fray Jerónimo Clota celebrated the first Catholic mass on the islands. The Spanish did not remain in the area due to the continuing uprisings in other of their colonies.

Queen Pōmare IV expelled French Catholic missionaries from her kingdom in 1836 and provoked the annoyance of France. Between 1838 and 1842, French naval commander Abel Aubert du Petit-Thouars responded to French complaints and forced the queen and Tahitian chiefs to cede Tahiti as a French protectorate. In the 1880s France formally annexed the islands.

Today the Catholic Church owns at least 45 religious buildings in the area, all under the ecclesiastical responsibility of the Metropolitan Archdiocese of Papeete (Archidiocese of Papeete or Archidioecesis Papeetensis) with headquarters on the island of Tahiti. The Cathedral of Our Lady of the Immaculate Conception (Cathédrale Notre-Dame de l'Immaculée Conception) stands out on the island.

On each island the religious situation is different. On Bora Bora, for example, there are more Protestant Christians than Catholic Christians, as a result of the fact that the English arrived there before the French, however, both groups now regularly perform ecumenical Christian acts and live together.

Transport
Each of the Society Islands has a small airport. Faa'a International Airport is located in Tahiti and is the largest airport in the Society Islands.

See also

References

External links
 

 
 
Archipelagoes of French Polynesia
Eastern Indo-Pacific
Marine ecoregions